Joseph Duffy may refer to:

Joseph Duffy (bishop) (born 1934), Irish bishop
Joseph Duffy (cricketer) (1860–1936), Australian cricketer
Joe Duffy (born 1956), Irish radio personality
Joseph Duffy (fighter) (born 1988), Irish mixed martial arts fighter

See also
 Joseph Duffey (born 1932), American academic, educator and political appointee